Eupoecila miskini is a member of the scarab beetle family indigenous to Australia, belonging to genus Eupoecila. It is closely related to Eupoecila inscripta.

References

Cetoniinae
Beetles described in 1876